St. Lucy Catholic Parish is the Roman Catholic parish church of the Latin Rite in Campbell, California.  The church was originally established as a Mission of Saint Martin Parish of San Jose in 1914.  The current church was built in 1957.

See also
 Roman Catholic Diocese of San Jose in California

References

External links

 Saint Lucy Parish

Roman Catholic Diocese of San Jose in California
Roman Catholic churches in California
Campbell, California
Churches in Santa Clara County, California